Matthew Jasper (born 12 September 1972) is a British short track speed skater. He competed at the 1992 Winter Olympics and the 1998 Winter Olympics.

References

External links
 
Matthew Jasper at ISU
Matthew Jasper at the-sports.org

1972 births
Living people
British male short track speed skaters
Olympic short track speed skaters of Great Britain
Short track speed skaters at the 1992 Winter Olympics
Short track speed skaters at the 1998 Winter Olympics
People from Long Eaton
Sportspeople from Derbyshire